Pacific Coast High School (PCHS) is a public high school in Tustin, California, United States. It is part of the Orange County Department of Education.

References

External links 
 

High schools in Orange County, California
Public high schools in California